Remo Giazotto (4 September 1910, Rome – 26 August 1998, Pisa) was an Italian musicologist, music critic, and composer, mostly known through his systematic catalogue of the works of Tomaso Albinoni. He wrote biographies of Albinoni and other composers, including Antonio Vivaldi.

Giazotto served as a music critic (from 1932) and editor (1945–1949) of the Rivista musicale italiana and was appointed co-editor of the Nuova rivista musicale italiana in 1967. He was a professor of the history of music at the University of Florence (1957–69) and in 1962 was nominated to the Accademia Nazionale di S. Cecilia.

In 1949, Giazotto became the director of the chamber music programs for Italian state broadcaster RAI and in 1966 was appointed director of its international programs organized through the European Broadcasting Union. He was also the president of RAI's auditioning committee and editor of its series of biographies on composers.

Giazotto was the father of physicist Adalberto Giazotto.

Adagio in G minor 

Giazotto is famous for his publication of a work called Adagio in G minor, which he claimed to have transcribed from a manuscript fragment of an Albinoni sonata that he had found in the Saxon State Library. He stated that he had arranged the work but not composed it. He subsequently revised this story, claiming it as his own original composition. The fragment has never appeared in public; Giazotto stated that it contained only the bass line, and the work was copyrighted by Giazotto.

Writings 
Il melodramma a Genova nei secoli XVII e XVIII (Genoa, 1941)
Tomaso Albinoni, 'musico violino dilettante veneto' (1671–1750) (Milan, 1945)
Busoni: la vita nell opera (Milan, 1947)
La musica a Genova nella vita pubblica e privata dal XIII al XVIII secolo (Genoa, 1951)
Poesia melodrammatica e pensiero critico nel Settecento (Milan, 1952)
Il Patricio di Hercole Bottrigari dimostrato praticamente da un anonimo cinquecentesco, CHM, i (1953), 97–112
Harmonici concenti in aere veneto (Rome, 1955)
La musica italiana a Londra negli anni di Purcell (Rome, 1955)
Annali Mozartiani (Milan, 1956)
Giovan Battista Viotti (Milan, 1956)
Musurgia nova (Mila, 1959)
Vita di Alessandro Stradella (Milan, 1962)
Vivaldi (Milan, 1965)
"La guerra dei palchi", Nuova Rivista Musicale Italiana, i (1967), 245–86, 465–508; iii (1969), 906–33; v (1971), 1304–52
"Nel CCC anno della morte di Antonio Cesti: ventidue lettere ritrovate nell' Archivio di Stato di Venezia", Nuova Rivista Musicale Italiana, iii (1969), 496–512

References

1910 births
1998 deaths
20th-century Italian composers
20th-century Italian male musicians
20th-century Italian musicologists
Italian male composers
Italian male non-fiction writers
Italian music critics
Musicians from Rome
Academic staff of the University of Florence